Rhytiphora albospilota is a species of beetle in the family Cerambycidae. It was described by Per Olof Christopher Aurivillius in 1893. It is known from Australia.

References

albospilota
Beetles described in 1893